Otmar Braunecker (born 4 April 1943) is an Austrian speed skater. He competed at the 1968 Winter Olympics and the 1972 Winter Olympics.

References

1943 births
Living people
Austrian male speed skaters
Olympic speed skaters of Austria
Speed skaters at the 1968 Winter Olympics
Speed skaters at the 1972 Winter Olympics
Sportspeople from Klagenfurt